Gabriel Péri (Peri) (9 February 1902 — 15 December 1941) was a prominent French communist journalist and politician who was a member of the French Resistance. He was executed in German-occupied France during the Second World War.

Early life
Péri was born in Toulon to a Corsican family. Forced to give up his studies at an early age, the First World War and the Russian Revolution had a profound effect on him and his involvement in revolutionary politics. He immersed himself in political activities, and wrote for newspapers in Aix-en-Provence and Marseille.

Career and execution
At the age of 22, Péri became departmental manager of foreign politics at l'Humanité. He was elected deputy to the French National Assembly for Argenteuil in 1932 and re-elected in 1936.

In the National Assembly, Péri distinguished himself as an expert in the field of diplomatic and international relations and was a strident antifascist. He denounced both Benito Mussolini's invasion of Ethiopia and France's non-intervention during the Spanish Civil War. Péri was also a prominent opponent of the Nazi regime in Germany.

On 21 January 1940, however, after the German-Soviet Pact, he was stripped of his mandate to the National Assembly, and on 3 April, he was sentenced to five years in military prison, fined and stripped of his civic and political rights for reconstituting a legally-dissolved organization. He went into hiding as a result.
    
The Fall of France in 1940 caused northern France to be placed under German occupation. Arrested by the French police on 18 May 1941, Péri was jailed at Fort Mont-Valérien, which was under the control of the German forces. He was executed there on 15 December with a group of 70 men. Albert Camus learned of Péri's execution while he was staying in Lyon, an event that he later said crystallised his own revolt against the Germans.

Legacy
Many schools and streets have been named after Péri, as well as a Paris metro station and another in Lyon. Paul Éluard and Louis Aragon wrote poems in his tribute (titled "Gabriel Péri" and "Ballade de Celui Qui Chanta Dans les Supplices" ["Ballad to Him who Sings While Being Tortured"], respectively).

References

External links

Lettre d'adieu de Gabriel Péri 
Gabriel Péri: a free and lucid mind
 

1902 births
1941 deaths
Politicians from Toulon
French anti-fascists
Executed politicians
French civilians killed in World War II
Marxist journalists
Resistance members killed by Nazi Germany
French people of Corsican descent
French Communist Party politicians
French people executed by Nazi Germany
People executed by Nazi Germany by firearm
Deaths by firearm in France
Executed people from Provence-Alpes-Côte d'Azur
French male writers
Communist members of the French Resistance
20th-century French journalists